Ralph Tony Sarich  (born 10 December 1938 in Baskerville, Western Australia) is an Australian automotive engineer, inventor, and businessman who developed the orbital engine and the orbital combustion process engine. Sarich founded the Orbital Engine Company, which developed the orbital combustion process (OCP) engine, based on the two-stroke concept.

Early life
Sarich was born on 10 December 1938, in Baskerville, Western Australia to an Austrian and Croatian family. His parents arrived in Australia before the Great Depression of the 1930s. Sarich began an apprenticeship as a fitter and turner, studying high school years 11 and 12 subjects part-time at Midland Technical School. He qualified with top achievement at the completion of his apprenticeship, during and after which he did engineering units one day per week, night classes, and by correspondence.

Career
His working career encompassed being a fitter and turner and trainee engineer with the Western Australian Government Railways between 1954 and 1963. He was plant engineer with Thiess Brothers between 1963 and 1965, in charge on the standard gauge project before running his own business, an engineering and service station operator. Sarich was sales engineer as well as investor in the area of earth moving and industrial machinery before being regional general manager and an investor. As he developed the orbital engine, he became managing director of Orbital Engine Company Pty Ltd, and chief executive officer and chairman of Orbital Engine Corporation. Following his retirement from Orbital, he became Executive Chairman of Cape Bouvard Investments, a private family investment company.

Orbital engine

Sarich concentrated on research and development of new technologies, in particular the orbital engine. The engine was first fired in 1972 and Sarich appeared on ABC TV program The Inventors in 1972 claiming that the engine's compact design promised more power, fewer emissions and significant fuel economy. The technology was endorsed by the Royal Automobile Club of Western Australia in 1974:

The "staged combustion" process was later named as the orbital combustion process (OCP). There were two distinct orbital concepts; the OCP technology and the orbital engine hardware that converted the resultant combustion energy to mechanical output to drive vehicles. Under simulated urban and highway driving cycles it produced fuel and emission results superior to the best selected engines of the era. This was due to the OCP, often wrongly referred to as the fuel injection system because of its vital role in this technology. As the OCP technology was used on conventional engines to improve their performance this then led to inaccurate reporting claiming that the Orbital Engine Technology had failed. However, this combination was deemed to be the most cost-effective direction because it eliminated production re-tooling costs, which were inhibiting factors for mass production using orbital engine hardware.

Despite being offered A$12 million in 1973 for his stake in Orbital, Sarich refused to sell. BHP was an early investor in Sarich's Orbital Engine Company, taking a stake in the early 1970s that by 1989 represented 35% of the total company equity.

The OCP component of the engine was described in the 1980s by the Jet Propulsion Laboratories (JPL) for NASA, as the "cutting edge of world engine technology". International emission testing laboratories confirmed the Australian results. Fuel economy advantages of 50% were demonstrated against the best outboard marine engines and 20–25% under typical automobile operating conditions. Additional savings of 5–10% were considered readily achievable with further development. The savings were accompanied by a massive reduction in the "direct engine out" of several key emissions gases.

The OCP technology was sold as intellectual property (IP) to automobile, marine and motorcycle manufacturers and was incorporated in production engines to varying degrees; namely from complete systems to the improvement of their own technology, via knowledge gained from their IP purchases. All licensing payments were conditional upon the delivery of engines meeting numerous high emissions standards, fuel economies and other technical criteria. All deliveries met these criteria prior to Sarich's retirement in 1992, resulting in no dependent monetary penalties ever being incurred to that point in time.

However, key components of Sarich's engine could not be cooled and others could not be readily lubricated. The engine was susceptible to overheating, and the invention was eventually deemed too impractical.

In the United States
Sarich sought A$100 million in investment from the Australian Government in order to commence manufacture of the engine in Australia. In 1989, the government offered an industry support package of A$1516.5 million, which Sarich declined, and he proceeded to make arrangements to establish operations in the United States. He floated Orbital Engine Corporation in the US via an initial public offering that raised A$113.8 million in 1992 and the company began trading on the New York Stock Exchange. In 1998, Sarich reported that Orbital Engine Corporation had entered into a nonexclusive licensing agreement with the Ford to develop and test a pilot for the manufacture of the orbital engine. In January 1992, General Motors displayed its newest concept car called the "Ultralite", incorporating OCP technology, as its centrepiece at the Detroit International Auto Show. In April 1992, another of the world's largest automotive manufacturers signed an agreement to take a licence for OCP technology.

In other countries
In 1991 it was reported that Orbital Engine Corporation entered into a licensing agreement with Fiat, an Italian car manufacturer. Despite initial interest, Czechoslovakian manufacturer, Škoda, withdrew from licensing negotiations in 1989, citing poor economic conditions in the country. Volkswagen terminated its agreement with Orbital in 1993, citing a softer European sales market.

Other inventions
In addition to the orbital engine, Sarich is credited with the following additional inventions:
Earth moving scraper/scoop
Initial Australian Water Watcher
Special orchard cultivator
Non-geared transmission for cars
High pressure orchard spray pump
Security Cable Gate – sold Australia wide
Linear Wind Generator
World's first two-speed reel for Marlin fishing

Value and retirement
As Orbital Engine Corporation sold its IP to manufacturers and the company did not manufacture engines, the success of Orbital was doubted. However, the company's financial success is reflected in the fiscal years 1989, 1990 (A$23.5m), 1991 and 1992 (A$22.75m).

Orbital's capitalised value upon Sarich's retirement as CEO in 1992 was in excess of A$1 billion. Over A$200 million at the time in cash, receivables, and research value convertible to cash, were scheduled for commercial investment as insurance against excessive dependence on the auto industry. Sarich converted a component of the risk element into relatively secure investments in synergetic corporations as patents expired and related IP income ceased. Since his retirement, Orbital's new management invested retained earnings on further research. Sarich sold his equity for a reputed A$100 million.

Following his retirement from Orbital, Cape Bouvard Investments (CBI) became the main focus for Sarich in his capacity as Executive Chairman of the private family investment company; while his son Peter is responsible for operations. CBI invests in numerous fields such as property investment, property development, technology and equities.

Personal life
Sarich met Patricia in 1957 and they married in September 1962. Her parents also migrated to Australia as little children from Britain after World War I. Patricia was born in Kellerberrin, Western Australia. They have two children, Peter and Jennifer (deceased). 

Sarich donated a considerable amount of the profits from the Orbital Corporation into the community, including commitments of approximately A$65 million to various charitable organisations,  including a A$20 million gift in 2008 towards neuroscience medical research facilities in Perth.

Net worth 
In 2015, the BRW Rich 200 assessed Sarich's net worth to be 1.05 billion, and on the Forbes list of Australia's 50 Richest people, Sarich's net worth was estimated at 0.66 billion.

Awards
Sarich has been the recipient of many prestigious engineering, commercial and civil awards including:

1972 Australian Broadcasting Commission Inventor of the Year
1972 Citizen of the Year
1972 Sir Lawrence Hartnett Inventors Award – Science
1972 West Australian Citizen of the Year
1973 Jaycees Outstanding Young Australian
1986 Hartnett Medal of the Royal Society of Arts for contribution to manufacture and commerce
1987 Doctor of Science from Murdoch University
1988 Officer of the Order of Australia (AO) for service to engineering
1987 The Churchill Medal awarded by the Society of Engineers, and the first Australian to be awarded the Medal
1988 Honorary Fellow of the Society of Engineers
1991 Clunies Ross Award for automotive engineering by the National Academy of Science & Technology

Published work
 

References

Further reading
 
 
 
 
 
 RAC Magazine 1973 (Report)
 Ford Fleet Validation Executive/Engineer statement 9/12/09
 Perth's Hot Marlin Chew'' Magazine, March 2000, p. 71

External links

 

1938 births
20th-century Australian inventors
Australian people of Austrian descent
Australian people of Croatian descent
Living people
Australian billionaires
Australian philanthropists
Officers of the Order of Australia